Robin del Castillo  is a Colombian musician who is becoming internationally famous for his salsa music. Since 2001, Robin Del Castillo has been based in London (UK). His most famous song is perhaps "Aquella Mujer" which he recorded in 2006 in Colombia.

Early life and career
Robin del Castillo was born in Cali, Colombia. Robin has a real passion for Music and has been dreaming about music ever since the age of 7.  Robin grew up in a country where music is all around in its purest and most divers form; he remembers listening, playing, and dancing to many kinds of rhythms. The richness of this background gave him the ability to sing any kind of music. However over the past years, working as a professional singer, he specialized in Latin Tropical Music (Salsa, Merengue, Cumbia, Bachata, Reggaeton, and Latin pop).

In the 90s in Cali, Colombia, a popular TV program SONEROS 4 was offering the chance to amateurs impassioned by music to perform in public. Singing has always been his passion. Therefore, in 1994, at the age of 15, Robin decided to participate in this TV Show. This was his first time performing in front of cameras and such a big crowd.
Following the show, he received calls from numerous salsa bands in Cali. From this moment on, Robin took part in many well known bands in Colombia such as  Cali Sabor, The Metropolitan Police band (during his military service), Los Gomelos under the label of Sony Music Entertainment, the Merengue Band under the label of "Los lideres de Venezuela", and the Matacena Orchestra under the label of FM Records.
His career as a singer offered him the opportunity to visit many countries like: Ecuador, Peru, Venezuela, Spain, Italy, France, and England.

2001- Present: London base
In 2001 Robin finally decided to take base in London (UK) to work and start a new life style. In the same year, he had the pleasure to meet Mr. Roberto Pla; the leader of one of the most well known Latin jazz and Salsa band in the UK.

After a couple of months, he became Robin del Castillo. He created his own Latin band and recorded 3 tropical albums: 2 of them were made with very well known cover songs and the third one, from his own inspiration, is called "Pa’ Mi Tierra".

Over the past 7 years, Robin Del Castillo has been playing and taking part in the most successful Latin events in London. In addition, he did musical accompaniment for singers like: David Pabon, Pedro Conga, Paquito Guzman, Luisito Carrion, Jose Bello, Mariano Civico, Roberto Blades among others.

They also regularly perform in private parties, birthdays, Embassies (i.e. Panama, Australia, Peru, Mexico, Spain) and weddings, as for example Mr. Martin Campbell's wedding, Director of Casino Royal 007, in Geneva, Switzerland.

Success
His success went beyond UK’s frontiers, and extended to countries like: Spain, Italy, France, Switzerland, Dubai, Cyprus, Netherlands, Belgium where many people witnessed his talent and charisma on stage.

Robin del Castillo was one of the artists nominated for the "GSD Media and Latin American Music award UK 2009", in the following categories: Best Latin song of the year with '"Aquella Mujer"', Best Latin music Video also with '"Aquella Mujer"', and the "Revelation Latino".

Discography
2009: Robin Del Castillo is currently launching his new album called Pa’ Mi Tierra with 10 songs; he is the author and compositor of 8 of those songs, and the other 2 are famous romantic Latin songs that he adapted to Salsa music.

This album is a mix of several Latin rhythms: Salsa, Chacha, Salsaton...The song "She's the One" for example is a Salsaton (mix of Salsa and Reggaeton) in Spanglish.

Track Listing of the album Pa'Mi Tierra

1. "Pa'Mi Tierra" – 4:25

2. "Muere de Pena" – 5:32

3. "She's the one"  – 4:16

4. "Dayana" – 3:58

5. "Aquella Mujer" – 4:30

6. "Fiestas de Navidad" – 4:05

7. "Ya No Puedo Amarte" – 5:30

8. "Ni se le ocurra" – 4:31

9. "Mori" – 4:53

10. "Olvidarte" – 6:01

Del Castillo Latin Productions limited

In August 2009, Robin Del Castillo opened his own entertainment company: Del Castillo Latin Productions ltd.

Del Castillo Latin Productions ltd hosted its first exclusive live Salsa Concerts in London on September 18 and 19, 2009 with the very famous Jose Bello (Dominican Salsa singer, living in New York), and Camilo Azuquita (Panamian Salsa singer, living in Paris).

It was the first time that those two maestros de la salsa were performing in London (UK), and the first time that both talents were re-united on the same stage.

Numerous media and newspapers related the event (Latin and British newspapers alike). Time out London described the event with terms as laudatory as: "a live set from acclaimed Dominican Republic salsa singer, Bello, with sumptuous backing from Robin del Castillo and his orchestra"

Notes and references

External links
 Robin del Castillo's official website

1978 births
Living people
People from Cali
Colombian expatriates in England
Colombian musicians
Salsa musicians